"Rachel" is a song by Australian singer Russell Morris. The song was written by Raymond Froggatt and produced by Howard Gable.

It was released as a single in April 1970 and peaked at number 23 on the Australian Go-Set chart in May 1970. The track peaked at number 1 in New Zealand.

Background and recording
In 1969, Morris travelled to London to promote this track "The Real Thing" with UK label Decca Records. The song was a commercial failure and failed to chart. Whilst there, Russell recorded two numbers with expatriate Aussie guitarist and former Bee Gee Vince Melouney, one being Melouney’s "Little Lady", the other "Rachel". These cuts remain unreleased, the perfectionist singer being very unhappy with the producer's mix.

Morris returned to Melbourne in December 1969 and immediately set about fresh recording sessions with EMI and re-recorded of "Rachel".It was released as a single in April 1970, peaking at number 23. The single's fate was in part determined, as that of many other single releases at the time, by the controversial 1970 radio ban which resulted in major United Kingdom and Australian pop songs being refused airplay, including Morris' EMI.

Track listing
 7" Single
Side A "Rachel" - 4:27
Side B "Slow Joey" - 2:26

Charts

Weekly charts

Year-end charts

See also
 List of number-one singles in 1970 (New Zealand)

References

Russell Morris songs
1970 songs
1970 singles
EMI Records singles
Number-one singles in New Zealand